Georg Rudolf (von) Stackelberg (12 October 1872 Salla Parish (now Väike-Maarja Parish), Kreis Wierland - 15 March 1934 Küti Parish, Virumaa) was an Estonian politician. He was a member of Estonian Constituent Assembly. He was a member of the assembly since 27 January 1920. He replaced Johannes Meier.

References

1872 births
1934 deaths
People from Väike-Maarja Parish
People from Kreis Wierland
Baltic-German people
German-Baltic Party politicians
Members of the Estonian Constituent Assembly
Members of the Riigikogu, 1920–1923
Estonian military personnel of the Estonian War of Independence